European route E 420 is a north-south European route from Nivelles in Belgium to Reims in France.

Route 
 
 E19 Nivelles 
 Charleroi
 
 E17, E46, E50 Reims

References

External links 
 UN Economic Commission for Europe: Overall Map of E-road Network (2007)

420
E420
E420